Mechanics Hall (and variants Mechanic's Hall and Mechanics' Hall) may refer to different current or former meeting halls:

 Mechanics Hall, owned by the Massachusetts Charitable Mechanic Association in Boston, on Bedford Street, 1860s-1870s
 Mechanics Hall (Boston, Massachusetts), on Huntington Avenue, 1881-1959
 Mechanics' Hall (Toronto)
 Mechanics' Hall, New York City
 Mechanics' Hall (Portland, Maine)
 Mechanics Hall (Worcester, Massachusetts)
 Mechanics' Theatre, Dublin

Architectural disambiguation pages